Vordorf is a municipality in the district of Gifhorn, in Lower Saxony, Germany. It is a member municipality of the Samtgemeinde Papenteich. The Municipality Vordorf includes the villages of Eickhorst, Rethen and Vordorf.

Municipal Council
The council of the Municipality Vordorf consists of 15 councilmen and woman:
 CDU 8 mandates (-1)
 SPD 6 mandates (-)
 FDP 1 mandate  (+1)
(Status: community election 10 September 2006 with a voter participation of 59,23%)

Language
In former times the everyday speech of Vordorf was an Eastphalian Papenteich Low Saxon dialect, whereas the speech in school and church was Standard German. Nowadays Standard German has displaced the dialect mostly.

References

Gifhorn (district)